Franco Sábato (born January 13, 1990) is an Argentine rugby sevens player.

References

External links 
 
 
 
 
 

1990 births
Living people
Male rugby sevens players
Argentine rugby union players
Olympic rugby sevens players of Argentina
Argentina international rugby sevens players
Rugby sevens players at the 2016 Summer Olympics
Sportspeople from Buenos Aires
Pan American Games medalists in rugby sevens
Pan American Games gold medalists for Argentina
Rugby sevens players at the 2019 Pan American Games
Medalists at the 2019 Pan American Games